The Ukrainian Cup 1997–98 was the seventh annual edition of Ukraine's 
football knockout competition since the country's independence.

This edition of the Cup started with a preliminary round of few pairs and three qualification knockout rounds before the first round of the competition. Two legs rounds were extended to the main portion of competition as well as some qualification rounds. Amateur clubs were represented by the winner of Ukrainian Amateur Cup only.

The cup holder Shakhtar Donetsk was eliminated on away goal rule by Metalurh Donetsk in Round of 16.

Qualification into European Competitions for the 1998–1999 season

The winner of this competition qualified as Ukraine's Cup Winner representative in the Cup Winners' Cup and was allowed to enter the competition in the first round.

Competition schedule

Preliminary round
At this stage in the competition, 20 teams from the Druha Liha and Ukrainian Football Amateur Association entered the competition.

First qualification round 
At this stage in the competition, the rest clubs of the Druha Lihaentered the competition.

Second qualification round 
At this stage in the competition, teams play two games, at home and away. Also, clubs of the First League has entered the competition.

|}

Third qualification round 

|}

Round of 32 
The Vyshcha Liha clubs entered the competition.

|}

Round of 16 

|}

First leg

Second leg

Chornomorets won 5–3 on aggregate.

2–2 on aggregate. Kryvbas won 4–3 on penalty kicks.

Vorskla won 1–0 on aggregate.

Quarter-finals 

|}

First leg

Second leg

Dynamo won 7–1 on aggregate.

Kryvbas won 2–1 on aggregate.

CSKA won 2–1 on aggregate.

2–2 on aggregate. Metalurh won on away goal rule.

Semi-finals 

|}

First leg

Second leg

Dynamo won 5–2 on aggregate.

CSKA won 4–2 on aggregate.

Final

See also
1997–98 Vyshcha Liha

References

Ukrainian Cup seasons
Cup
Ukrainian Cup